HMU or Hmu may refer to:

Universities 
 Harbin Medical University, in Heilongjiang, China
 Hebei Medical University, in Hebei, China
 Hainan Medical University, in Haikou, Hainan, China
 Hanoi Medical University, in Vietnam
 Hawler Medical University, in Erbil, Iraqi Kurdistan, Iraq
Hellenic Mediterranean University, in Crete, Greece

Other uses 
 Adang language, spoken in Indonesia
 Hmu Aung (1910–2004), Burmese politician
 Hmu language, or East Hmongic, spoken in eastern Guizhou, China
 Bo Hmu, a military rank in Burma; see Army ranks and insignia of Burma